Prabath de Zoysa (born 24 October 1999) is a Sri Lankan cricketer. He made his first-class debut for Sebastianites Cricket and Athletic Club in Tier B of the 2019–20 Premier League Tournament on 6 February 2020. He made his List A debut on 11 November 2021, for Galle Cricket Club in the 2021–22 Major Clubs Limited Over Tournament.

References

External links
 

1999 births
Living people
Sri Lankan cricketers
Galle Cricket Club cricketers
Sebastianites Cricket and Athletic Club cricketers